Jean-Baptiste Radet (20 January 1752, Dijon - 17 March 1830, Paris) was a French vaudevillist.

Prior to the French Revolution, he worked in the library of the duchesse de Villeroy, allowing him to indulge his literary tastes.  He had already had success with several plays at the Théâtre de l'Ambigu-Comique and Théâtre-Italien (Opéra-Comique), when he founded the Théâtre du Vaudeville with his friend Pierre-Yves Barré.  Notable among his plays are :
 Renaud d'Ast (1787)
 La Chaste Suzanne (1793)
 Gaspard l'avisé
 La Maison en loterie.

Sources

External links
His plays and their 18th century productions on CESAR

1752 births
1830 deaths
Writers from Dijon
18th-century French dramatists and playwrights
19th-century French dramatists and playwrights